The tenth season of American Dad! aired on Fox from September 29, 2013, to May 18, 2014. This is the final full season on Fox, as the next season is a mini-season featuring three unaired episodes that Fox quickly aired, in order for the network to end the show.

On August 2, 2013, it was first announced that Mariah Carey would guest voice-star as a redneck character in the 10th season episode "Kung Pao Turkey". The heavily publicized episode aired on November 24, 2013. Also, the Christmas episode "Minstrel Krampus", which would have aired during the previous season but was delayed due to the Sandy Hook Elementary School shooting, aired on December 15, 2013.

Guest voice actors for this season include Zooey Deschanel, Danny Glover, Chloë Grace Moretz, Mark Cuban, Olivia Wilde, Sinbad, Josh Groban, Alan Thicke, Robin Thicke, Gillian Jacobs, Terry Crews, Gary Busey, Mae Whitman, Pete Holmes, Diego Luna, Patrick Stewart, Alison Brie and Nancy Cartwright as Bart Simpson.


Episode list

References

2013 American television seasons
2014 American television seasons
American Dad! (season 10) episodes